"Same God" is a song performed by American contemporary worship band Elevation Worship which was released the second single from their tenth live album, Lion (2022), on June 17, 2022. The song was written by Brandon Lake, Chris Brown, Pat Barrett, and Steven Furtick.

"Same God" peaked at No. 1 on the US Hot Christian Songs chart, becoming Elevation Worship's second chart-topping single.

Background
On January 21, 2022, Elevation Worship released "Same God" featuring Jonsal Barrientes as the first promotional single in the lead-up to the release of its parent album, Lion (2022), accompanied with its music video. The radio version of "Same God" was released on June 17, 2022, making it the second single from the album.

Chris Brown of Elevation Worship spoke about song, saying: "I hope the song portrays His character and nature in a way that takes people on a journey and reminds people that we're a part of a great cloud of witnesses that have seen this same faithful God make good on His promises to the generations before us, and those to come after."

Composition
The lyrics of the song describe "the consistent and unchanging nature of God's wisdom, power, goodness and generosity toward His children."

Critical reception
Timothy Yap, reviewing for JubileeCast, opined in his review that the song "has the word "classic worship song" written all over it." Jonathan Andre in his 365 Days of Inspiring Media review opined that "this 8 minute track (it's way too long!) sounds like we're treating God like a genie in a bottle ready to fulfil everything we want rather than what He wants. I'll admit though, this song does have passion and a firm belief that God will do miracles for us when we ask."

Commercial performance
"Same God" debuted at No. 21 on the US Hot Christian Songs chart dated February 5, 2022, concurrently charting at number one on the Christian Digital Song Sales chart, and at number 20 on the Christian Streaming Songs chart. "Same God" debuted at No. 50 on the US Christian Airplay chart dated May 28, 2022. The song peaked at number one on the Hot Christian Songs and Christian Airplay charts dated January 21, 2023. "Same God" marks Elevation Worship's second Hot Christian Songs number one single and their third Christian Airplay number one single. It is also the third song to simultaneous reach number one on both charts, after "Graves into Gardens" by Elevation Worship featuring Brandon Lake in February 2021, and "Overcomer" by Mandisa in September 2013.

Music videos
Elevation Worship released the music video for "Same God" featuring Jonsal Barrientes leading the song during an Elevation Church worship service, via YouTube on January 21, 2022. The official lyric video for the song was issued by Elevation Worship through YouTube on March 4, 2022. On June 17, 2022, Elevation Worship published the official audio video for the radio version of "Same God" on YouTube.

On August 24, 2022, Elevation Worship published an acoustic performance video of the song on YouTube. The video was recorded in the loft of a recently restored barn in Charlotte, North Carolina, showing Barrientes and Brandon Lake leading the song.

Track listing

Charts

Weekly charts

Year-end charts

Release history

References

External links
 

2022 songs
Elevation Worship songs
Songs written by Steven Furtick
Songs written by Brandon Lake